APFL is an acronym which may represent:

Adelaide Plains Football League, an Australian rules football league
American Professional Football League, name adopted by the American Professional Football Association in 1921, one year before changing its name again to the National Football League
American Professional Football League, a former indoor football league that operated in mid-west United States